Bereznik is a rural locality (a village) in Pereborskoye Rural Settlement, Beryozovsky District, Perm Krai, Russia. The population was 6 as of 2010.

Geography 
It is located 1.5 km north from Perebor.

References 

Rural localities in Beryozovsky District, Perm Krai